Richard A. Moran is a  San Francisco based speaker, investor, venture capitalist,  author and president emeritus of Menlo College. He is known for his series of business books beginning with, Never Confuse a Memo with Reality that established the genre of "Business Bullet Books."

Biography
Raised in Rahway, New Jersey, Moran graduated in 1968 from Rahway High School.

Moran is General Partner at Tonic Bioventures https://tonicbioventures.com/ and founding partner of Blue Book Ventures. Investments include: RightRice, SiSaf, PopChips, Siembra Mobile, CavoGene, Warehouse Exchange and AxoProtego, as well as a variety of start-ups in media and entertainment.  He hosts the weekly show "In the Workplace" on KCBS Radio.  https://www.audacy.com/kcbsradio

Moran was the tenth president of Menlo College, a private four year college located in Silicon Valley. He is the first former president there given the "Emeritus" status for his contributions. Moran previously served as CEO and vice chairman at Accretive Solutions, a national professional services firm with a focus on accounting, information technology and outsourcing.  Accretive Solutions was sold in December 2017 to Resources Global Professionals.

Prior to Accretive Solutions, Moran was a partner at Venrock, chairman of the board at Portal Software which was sold to Oracle for $220M.

The Moran Family owns and operates a vineyard and winery in Knights Valley in Sonoma County. Moran chronicles the development of the vineyard and restoring an old house in his column "In the Country" which has been running in wine country newspapers since 1997. The column received third place in journalism at the 2018 California Journalism Awards.

Writing
Moran has written ten business books. His latest book is "Never Say Whatever, How Small Decisions Make A Big Difference, 2023, McGraw Hill, ISBN: 978-126476-9643. His work has been translated into eight languages.

Other works include:
Trump@Work, 2020, ISBN 978-0-367-27354-5
The Thing About Work: Showing Up and Other Important Matters: A Worker's Manual was released in October 2016.
Navigating Tweets, Feats, and Deletes: Lessons for the New Workplace (2014)()
Sins and CEOs: Lessons from Leaders and Losers That Will Change Your Career (2011)
Nuts Bolts & Jolts: Fundamental Business and Life Lessons You Must Know (2006)
Fear No Yellow Stickies: More Business Wisdom Too Simple Not to Know (1998)
Cancel the Meeting, Keep the Doughnuts: And Other New Morsels of Business Wisdom (1995)
Beware Those Who Ask For Feedback: And Other Organizational Constants (1994)
Never Confuse A Memo with Reality: And Other Business Lessons Too Simple Not to Know (1993)

References

External links

Richard Moran
https://www.bluebookventures.com/
https://axoprotego.com/
https://cavogene.com/
https://www.warehouseexchange.com/
Irish Technology Capital
Red Room writers

1950 births
Living people
American business writers
American social scientists
American business theorists
Futurologists
Miami University alumni
Indiana University alumni
People from Rahway, New Jersey
Rahway High School alumni
Rutgers University alumni